The Buller by-election of 1933 was a by-election during the 24th New Zealand Parliament in the  electorate. It was held on Wednesday 22 November 1933. The seat had become vacant due to the death of Labour party leader Harry Holland who was also the leader of the opposition. Two candidates contested the seat, and it was won by Labour's Paddy Webb, who defeated Liberal-Labour candidate H. Ian Simpson who had support from the governing United Party.

Results
The following table gives the election results:

References

Buller 1933
1933 elections in New Zealand
Politics of the West Coast, New Zealand